Events in the year 1861 in Portugal.

Incumbents
Monarch: Peter V (died 11 November); Luís I (from 22 December)
Prime Minister: Nuno José Severo de Mendoça Rolim de Moura Barreto, 1st Duke of Loulé

Events
 22 April - Legislative election.

Arts and entertainment

Sports

Births

Deaths

11 November – Pedro V of Portugal, king (born 1837)

References

 
1860s in Portugal
Portugal
Years of the 19th century in Portugal
Portugal